I Never Liked You (stylized in all caps) is the ninth studio album by American rapper Future. It was released on April 29, 2022, by Freebandz and Epic Records. The production on the album was handled by multiple producers including ATL Jacob, FnZ, Southside, Taurus, TM88, and Wheezy, among others. The album features guest appearances from Kanye West, Gunna, Young Thug, Drake, Tems, EST Gee, and Kodak Black. The deluxe edition was released three days later on May 2, 2022, with additional guest appearances from Babyface Ray, 42 Dugg, Lil Baby, Lil Durk, and Young Scooter.

I Never Liked You was supported by four singles: "Worst Day", "Wait for U", "Keep It Burnin" and "Love You Better". The album received generally positive reviews from critics and was a huge commercial success. It debuted atop the US Billboard 200, earning 222,000 album-equivalent units in its first week. It is Future's eighth US number-one and 15th top-10 album. In November 2022, the album was certified platinum by the Recording Industry Association of America (RIAA).

Promotion
The album's first single, "Worst Day", was released on February 11, 2022, as well an accompanying music video. The song debuted at number 34 on the US Billboard Hot 100.

"Wait for U" featuring Canadian rapper and singer Drake and Nigerian singer Tems, was released to American rhythmic contemporary radio on May 3, 2022, as the second official single from the album. Its music video was released on May 5. The song debuted at number one on the Billboard Hot 100, becoming Future's second, Drake's tenth, and Tems' first number-one hit on the Hot 100.

The music video for the song "Keep It Burnin", featuring American rapper Kanye West, was released on April 29, 2022. It was sent to Italian contemporary hit radio on May 6, 2022, as the third official single from the album. The song debuted at number 15 on the Billboard Hot 100.

"Love You Better" was released to American rhythmic contemporary radio on July 26, 2022, as the fourth official single from the album. The song debuted at number 12 on the Billboard Hot 100.

Critical reception

I Never Liked You was met with generally positive reviews. At Metacritic, which assigns a normalized rating out of 100 to reviews from professional publications, the album received an average score of 69, based on seven reviews. Aggregator AnyDecentMusic? gave it 6.5 out of 10, based on their assessment of the critical consensus.

Kyann-Sian Williams from NME enjoyed the album, saying, "At times, in the past, he has relied on his autotune to compensate for lacklustre lyricism, but Future is a megamind whose pioneering spirit is the very reason trap feels alive today. With I Never Liked You, you'll happily applaud him for that". In a positive review, Rolling Stones Mosi Reeves said, "I Never Liked You is no DS2, but it has a compositional sweep often absent from his work. Most importantly, it's an album with layers that's more engaging than recent fare such as 2019's appealing yet boilerplate Future Hndrxx Presents: The Wizrd and Save Me EP; and 2020's one-two punch of desultory hive-bait, High Off Life and Pluto × Baby Pluto, the latter with Lil Uzi Vert". Exclaim! critic Michael Di Gennaro said, "It's not a complete return to form, but it's a reminder that even later in the journeys, all-time greats' talent and dedication to their craft can still yield impressive results". Reviewing the album for HipHopDX, Anthony Malone stated, "I Never Liked You continues his stagnation from High Off Life, settling for comfort rather than experimentation. The songs are rehashes he's done more effectively in the past. His signature consistency is still there".

In a lukewarm review, Pitchforks Alphonse Pierre wrote, "Stymied by formulaic collaborations and unmemorable beats, the rapper's latest has the ingredients of a really good Future album but lacks the depth of one". Robin Murray of Clash said, "It's not a bad record – the highs more than justify your entrance – but with a rumoured follow up on the way, perhaps it's time for Future to break a few of his own rules once more".

Year-end lists

Industry awards

Commercial performance
I Never Liked You debuted at number one on the US Billboard 200 chart, earning 222,000 album-equivalent units (including 6,000 copies in pure album sales) in its first week. This became Future's eighth US number-one, 15th US top-10 album and the largest week for any album in 2022 at the time. The album also accumulated a total. of 283.75 million on-demand official streams for the album's tracks. In its second week, the album dropped to number two on the chart, earning an additional 116,000 units. In its third week, the album dropped to number three on the chart, earning 89,000 more units. In its fourth week, the album dropped to number four on the chart, earning 77,000 units. On November 30, 2022, the album was certified platinum by the Recording Industry Association of America (RIAA) for combined sales and album-equivalent units of over 1,000,000 units in the United States.

Track listing

Notes
  signifies an uncredited co-producer
 All tracks are stylized in all caps.

Sample credits
 "Wait for U" contains a sample of "Higher", written by Temilade Openiyi and Tejiri Akpoghene, as performed by Tems.

Personnel
 Joe LaPorta – mastering
 Ethan Stevens – mixing
 Eric Manco – engineering (tracks 1–3, 5, 7–16)
 Bryan Anzel – engineering (4, 6, 15)
 Noel Cadastre – engineering (7, 15)
 Khaya Gilika – engineering (10)
 Braden Davies – engineering assistance
 Zachary Acosta – engineering assistance

Charts

Weekly charts

Year-end charts

Certifications

Release history

References

2022 albums
Future (rapper) albums
Albums produced by FnZ
Albums produced by Southside (record producer)
Albums produced by TM88
Epic Records albums
Albums produced by Wheezy